Mark Fulton (born 16 September 1959 in Johnstone) is a Scottish former professional footballer who played for St Mirren, Hibernian and Hamilton Academical.

Fulton was outstanding as a young player at St Mirren, and was selected five times by the Scotland national under-21 football team. Fulton also represented the Scottish League once, in 1980. After making 160 league appearances for St Mirren, Fulton transferred to Hibernian in 1985. He made 30 league appearances for Hibs in his debut season and played in the 1985 Scottish League Cup Final. He fell out of favour at Easter Road in the following season and transferred to Hamilton Academical. He left the senior game after just over a year with the Accies.

He later became a police officer.

References

External links

1959 births
Association football central defenders
Hamilton Academical F.C. players
Hibernian F.C. players
Living people
People from Johnstone
Scotland under-21 international footballers
Scottish Football League players
Scottish footballers
St Mirren F.C. players
Johnstone Burgh F.C. players
Scottish Junior Football Association players
Scottish Football League representative players